These lists are a companion to the Wikipedia article entitled United States presidential nominating convention.

Significant third-party conventions before 1860

Major-party conventions

The two right-hand columns show nominations by notable conventions not shown elsewhere. Some of the nominees (e.g. the Whigs before 1860 and Theodore Roosevelt in 1912) received very large votes, while others who received less than 1% of the total national popular vote are listed to show historical continuity or transition. [For example, the Equal Rights Party convention of 1872 nominated the first national ticket to include either a woman (Victoria Woodhull) or an African-American (Frederick Douglass), although this ticket received no votes at all.]  

Many important candidates are not shown here because they were never endorsed by a national party convention (e.g. William Henry Harrison in 1836, George C. Wallace in 1968, John B. Anderson in 1980 and Ross Perot in 1992); for a list by year of all notable candidates (at least one Elector or 0.1% of the popular vote), please see List of United States presidential candidates.

Note that there is no organizational continuity between the American Parties of 1856 and 1972, the Union Parties of 1860, 1864, 1888, 1900 and 1936, or the Progressive Parties of 1912–16, 1924 and 1948–52.

Presidential winner in bold.

People's [Middle of the Road] = "Middle of the Road" faction of the People's Party, who opposed fusing with the Democrats after 1896.

Third-party conventions since 1872

Prohibition and socialist parties

The Prohibition Party was organized in 1869. At the 1896 Prohibition Party convention in Pittsburgh, the majority of delegates supported a "narrow-gauge" platform confined to the prohibition of alcohol, while a "broad-gauge" minority — who also wanted to advocate for Free Silver and other reforms — broke away to form the National Party.

The Socialist Party of America (1901–1972) resulted from a merger of the Social Democratic Party (founded 1898) with dissenting members of the Socialist Labor Party (founded 1876). The Socialist Party of America stopped running its own candidates for president after 1956, but a minority of SPA members who disagreed with this policy broke away in 1973 to form the Socialist Party USA (SPUSA).

¶ Note that the years refer to the relevant presidential election and not necessarily to the date of a convention making a nomination for that election. Some nominating conventions meet in the year before an election.

Workers', Communist and Socialist Workers parties

The Communist Party was formed by Leninists who had left the Socialist Party of America in 1919. The Socialist Workers Party was formed by Communists who followed Leon Trotsky rather than Joseph Stalin and briefly joined the Socialist Party before forming their own party in 1937.

Libertarian, Green, and Constitution Parties

In 1999, the United States Taxpayers' Party changed its name to the Constitution Party.

The individual article about a Libertarian convention after 1980 or a Green Party convention after 1996 is linked to its respective city in the table below. Cities linked for Constitution and U.S. Taxpayers' Party conventions lead to individual sections of Constitution Party National Convention.

Location of the Party Convention in Relation to Election Winner 
The list below shows the location of the party convention, along with the winner of the election. Bold font indicates that party won the presidential election. If the party won the state where the convention was held the box is shaded. Other parties are only listed if they garnered electoral college votes.

See also
 List of Democratic National Conventions
 List of Whig National Conventions
 List of Republican National Conventions
 Prohibition Party#Presidential campaigns 
 Socialist Party of America#National Conventions
 National conventions of the Communist Party USA
 Socialist Workers Party — Presidential politics
 Libertarian National Convention
 Constitution Party National Convention
 Green National Convention
 Reform Party of the United States of America
 American Party (1969)#Presidential and vice-presidential candidates
 Electoral History of the American Independent and American Parties

References

Sources (partial list)

 National Party Conventions eGuide, The Campaign Finance Institute, 
 Chase, James S. Emergence of the Presidential Nominating Convention, 1789–1832 (Houghton Mifflin: 1973).
 Congressional Research Service. Presidential Elections in the United States: A Primer. (Washington, Congressional Research Service, April 17, 2000).
 History House: Conventional Wisdom
 Kane, Joseph Nathan, Presidential Fact Book (Random House, New York,)
 Kull, Irving S. and Nell M., An Encyclopedia of American History in Chronological Order, enlarged and updated by Samuel H. Friedelbaum (Popular Library, New York, 1961)
 Morris, Richard B., Encyclopedia of American History, revised and enlarged edition (Harper & Row, New York and Evanston, Ill., 1961)
 Online NewsHour: Interview with Historian Michael Beschloss on the origins of the convention process
 Republican National Convention 2004: Convention History
 Taylor, Tim, The Book of Presidents (Arno Press, New York, 1972)

 
Political party assemblies
United States presidential primaries